Vermeș is a commune in Caraș-Severin County, western Romania with a population of 1,566 people (2011). It is composed of three villages: Ersig (Érszeg), Izgar (Izgár) and Vermeș.

References

Communes in Caraș-Severin County
Localities in Romanian Banat